The Ahler Bruchgraben (also: Ahler Bruchbach) is a left tributary of the River Else in the northeast of the German federal states of North Rhine-Westphalia and Lower Saxony. The stream is part of the Weser basin and drains a small area of the Ravensberg Hills (Ravensberger Hügelland).

See also 
List of rivers of North Rhine-Westphalia
List of rivers of Lower Saxony

References

External links
River information system

Rivers of North Rhine-Westphalia
Rivers of Lower Saxony
Rivers of Germany